The Treaty of Guarantee may refer to:
Treaty of Guarantee (proposed) between France, the United Kingdom and the United States of America.
Treaty of Guarantee (1960) between Cyprus, Greece, Turkey and the United Kingdom.